Guillemundus (also Guillemó) (died 827) was count of Razès and Conflent, in what is now southern France. 

He was  son of Bera of Barcelona. He received these counties from delegation of his father (before 820) and retained them when Bera was exiled to Rouen in 821/22. In 826 he joined the revolt of Aissó and, routed, fled to Córdoba.

827 deaths
Counts of Razès
Year of birth unknown
9th-century Visigothic people